Gregory Skyler Taylor (born December 24, 1982), known professionally as Skyzoo, is an American Songwriter  and rapper. He has released a number of notable solo and collaborative albums, including Cloud 9: The 3 Day High with 9th Wonder in 2006, The Salvation in 2009, A Dream Deferred in 2012, Music For My Friends in 2015, and his most recent solo album All the Brilliant Things. Skyzoo has also released a plethora of non-commercial mixtapes including Corner Store Classic and The Great Debater throughout his career, and has worked with artists such as Jill Scott, Wale, Lloyd Banks, Tyrese, Dr. Dre, Raheem Devaughn, Black Thought, Jadakiss, Talib Kweli, Spike Lee, John Legend, and others. Skyzoo has headlined or co-headlined often-yearly tours throughout Europe, the United Kingdom, Africa, Australia, and Asia, and he owns and operates the independent record label First Generation Rich.

Early life and education 
Skyzoo was born Gregory Skyler Taylor on December 24, 1982, in the Crown Heights section of Brooklyn, New York City. He was nicknamed Skyzoo by his parents after the Skyy disco song of the same name (his middle name is Skyler). Skyzoo moved to the Bedford-Stuyvesant section of Brooklyn in his youth. Skyzoo grew up listening to hip hop artists such as Big Daddy Kane, N.W.A, Kid 'n Play, EPMD, Eric B. & Rakim and A Tribe Called Quest, but it was the music video for Chi-Ali's '"Age Ain't Nuthin' But a Number" that inspired him to begin writing raps and focusing on the music business. He was nine years old at the time.  He was raised one block away from rapper Notorious B.I.G., and has often cited B.I.G.'s success as an influence on his writing. He also cites Jay-Z as an important inspiration, and names his favorites emcees as Jay-Z and Mos Def. During Skyzoo's teenage years his father moved to South Jamaica, Queens, and Skyzoo began spending much of his time there as well as in Brooklyn. He frequently references both boroughs in his music, and has two younger brothers. Instead of going to school in his own neighborhood as he got older, Skyzoo's parents enrolled him in a high school in Manhattan to take advanced classes. Skyzoo also attended college, but didn't finish, at SUNY Farmingdale in Long Island. In 2006, he was employed at Morgan Stanley at the age of 23. However, he was terminated for coming back from lunch late, which led him to pursue a music career full-time.

Career

Early years and material 
In 2002 Skyzoo began releasing his own mixtapes throughout New York, and he soon encountered the North Carolina rap crew the Justus League, collaborating on several projects. Skyzoo has won two Underground Music Awards, in the categories of "Best Male Rapper" in 2002 and "Best Lyricist" in 2008. An encounter with Justus League rapper Chaundon led to Skyzoo meeting producer 9th Wonder in 2005, and the two started a long-term collaboration. The pair would go on to record the collaborative EP Cloud 9: The 3 Day High, which reportedly took a total of three days to complete from start to finish. Released on September 12, 2006, the album was entirely produced by 9th Wonder, and included the singles "Way To Go" and "The Bodega." The release led to Skyzoo's first national feature, when he was placed in the "Show & Prove" section of XXL Magazine in October 2006. The project also lead to the 2007 vinyl release of the DJ Premier produced singles "Get It Done" b/w "Click", both featuring fellow Brooklyn rapper and frequent collaborator Torae. The EP led to media write ups in outlets such as XXL, The Source, Vibe, AllHipHop.com, HipHopDX.com, HipHopGame.com and others.

Skyzoo's mixtape Corner Store Classic was released for free on July 20, 2007. It had production from 9th Wonder, DJ Premier,  and others. Skyzoo contributed most vocals, though guest vocalists such as Sean Price, Guilty Simpson, and Torae. The album was generally well-received, and XXL gave it a positive rating of XL. In 2007, he stated that he had a sophomore studio album ready, called The Salvation, but was waiting for a major record deal before releasing it. In the spring of 2009, Skyzoo jointly signed to independent label Duck Down Records and to 9th Wonder's Jamla Records imprint. Skyzoo then went on to release the mixtape The Power of Words. Hosted by DJ Drama and Statik Selektah, the project included guest vocals from frequent collaborator Wale, Maino, Talib Kweli, Reks, Young Chris and others.

The Salvation (2009) 

Through Duck Down Records, his debut LP The Salvation was released on September 29, 2009 with the singles "The Beautiful Decay", "Popularity", "Easy To Fly", and "My Interpretation." Upon release Skyzoo described it as autobiographical and his most personal work. Skyzoo had been planning this album since he was 9 years old, and The Salvation provides an intricate view into his life and experiences. Instead of bringing in a large number of guest artists, Skyzoo handles most of the vocals himself, explaining the "album isn't exactly the way I planned it out at 9-years-old, but it tells my story. With that being said, no one can help tell my story better than me."  About the selection of guest rappers, according to Skyzoo, "it wasn't really a 'who's hot, who's not' type of thing. It was more so 'just get what sounds right.' I got a lot of big name producers, and I also got a lot of up and comers." Among the contributing producers are Best Kept Secret, 9th Wonder, Nottz, Just Blaze, Illmind, Needlz and Black Milk. It charted on various Billboard charts, reaching No. 126 on the Billboard 200, No. 4 on the Top Heatseekers chart, and No. 14 on the Tastemaker Albums chart. The album was generally well received. AllMusic gave it a positive review and a rating of 4/5, while XXL gave it 4/5 as well.

To promote the album, Skyzoo and director Mills Miller filmed a webisode series titled Saving Our Grace. The short documentaries were shot throughout New York City and showed six different characters, such as a single mother and a young drug dealer, each representing a different emotion displayed on the album. The series debuted on Skyzoo's official YouTube page in August 2009.  Overall five official music videos were released from The Salvation, starting with "The Necessary Evils" which was released in May 2008. The video was directed by Tee Smif of the production company KCCC and shows a teenage drug dealer attempting to change his lifestyle, and the highs and subsequent lows he faces. On July 30, 2009, the video for "The Beautiful Decay", produced by 9th Wonder and directed by Artemus Jenkins, was released. Following the release of the album, a video for the song "Popularity" was made and released on November 18, 2009. The video, directed by Todd Angkasuwan, is a parody on the popular high-school drama Saved by the Bell. Restless Films director Court Dunn directed the video for the third single "Easy To Fly.  Released on March 15, 2010, the video is an ode to the film "Love Jones". Skyzoo plays as Darius Lovehall with model Ashlee Ray as Nina Mosley. On April 21, 2010, Skyzoo released a video for the song "My Interpretation", the final single of the album. The video is directed by Artemus Jenkins.

Mixtapes and collaborations (2010–2011) 

Released on October 5, 2010, Skyzoo's collaborative EP with Illmind titled Live from the Tape Deck was a free-form showcase of his lyricism. Unlike Skyzoo's debut album The Salvation, there largely aren't deeply personal themes in Live from the Tape Deck. The album is a collection of "raw" hip hop with a cohesive backdrop. With this project, the two artists planned to bring what hip hop veterans such as Eric B. & Rakim, Gang Starr, EPMD, N.W.A and A Tribe Called Quest brought by having one producer with one sound and one theme. With the album, Skyzoo stated that his goal was "to make something that felt like a 2010 cassette tape. I wanted the content to be raw and lyric driven as always, but not as story driven or emotional as The Salvation was. There are still parts of the album that are stories and concepts, but not as much as my debut had. This one was more of a beats and rhymes type of album."  It was rated 'XL' (4/5) by XXL Magazine, and received an 'XXL' (5/5) rating in the 'lyrics' category of the review.

In 2011, Skyzoo amicably parted ways with 9th Wonder's Jamla Imprint, with the two remaining periodic collaborators. On June 7, 2011, Skyzoo released the free mixtape The Great Debater. The project was sponsored by the Jordan Brand, and featured the singles "The Definitive Prayer", "Test Drive", "Atypical", and "Written In The Drums". Skyzoo has said that the project was created as a "thank you" gift to his fans for continuously purchasing and supporting his releases. The project, 16 songs in total, contains almost all original production (excluding the N.E.R.D sampled "Inside Of Clouds" instrumental on "Could've Struck The Lotto") from producers such as Illmind, 9th Wonder, Swiff D, Best Kept Secret, Oh No, and others. The cover art drew attention for its usage of characters from The Cosby Show. Skyzoo has stated that The Great Debater is loosely based around the theme of achieving success in one's field, and that as a child he saw the Huxtable family as a picture of success. This led to him wanting to portray success on the mixtape's cover as he'd envisioned it in his youth. It was featured most major hip hop blogs, and The Great Debater was rated 'XL' (4/5) by XXL Magazine, where they stated Skyzoo "leaves nothing up for debate when it comes to his pen skills."

A Dream Deferred (2012) 

Skyzoo's sophomore full-length solo album, A Dream Deferred, was released on October 2, 2012. The album is the follow up to his debut The Salvation, and similar to his debut it focuses on an autobiographical writing form, with a larger musical scale. The album features Jill Scott, Freeway, Raheem Devaughn, and Talib Kweli, and includes production by Illmind, 9th Wonder, Black Milk, and others. The first single, "JanSport Strings", was released on August 29, 2012. Additional singles include the Jahlil Beats produced "Range Rover Rhythm", and then Skyzoo' single "Spike Lee Was My Hero" featuring Talib Kweli. The video for the latter, directed by Alex Ghassan, includes cameos from Spike Lee himself, who upon hearing the song reached out to Skyzoo via Twitter to be involved in the video process. The video debuted on BET's 106 & Park as the "New Joint Of The Day" in January 2013. A Dream Deferred  met with a largely positive critical response, and became one of Skyzoo's best charting albums, reaching No. 7 on the Top Heatseekers chart and No. 18 on Top Rap Albums chart. The album received an 'XL' rating via XXL, and at Metacritic, which assigns a normalized rating out of 100 to reviews from mainstream critics, the album received an average score of 86, which indicates "universal acclaim", based on 5 reviews.

Collaborative releases (2012–2013) 

He collaborated on the EP An Ode to Reasonable Doubt with Antman Wonder in 2013. The nine-track album, dedicated to Jay Z's album Reasonable Doubt, was released on Jay Z's birthday on December 4, 2014. A music video was also released for the album's track "Meeting the Presidents." According to Skyzoo, the idea for the EP came to him via a tweet from a fan asking him to consider remaking Jay-Z's debut, in a manner similar to how Elzhi recreated the Nas album Illmatic. With guest artists such as Torae, Sha Stimuli, and Kay Cola, the album was entirely produced and composed by Antman Wonder without the use of samples. Instead of sampling, Antman Wonder recreated the production with a live orchestra. It was generally well received by music critics, with publications such as HipHopDX giving it a positive review.

In 2013 Skyzoo completed his contractual obligations with Duck Down Records and in 2014 created his own label imprint: First Generation Rich, Inc (commonly referred to as "FGR"). At the request of fans over the years, Skyzoo and frequent collaborator Torae began working on the joint album Barrel Brothers. Singles included the Illmind produced "Blue Yankee Fitted", AntMan Wonder produced "Memorabilia", and DJ Premier produced "The Aura" , which was co-produced by AntMan Wonder. The project, released on May 27, 2014, features Guilty Simpson, Sean Price, Blu, Black Milk, and Apollo Brown, among others.

Music For My Friends (2015) 

Music For My Friends is the third solo album by Skyzoo. Featuring guest artists such as Jadakiss, Black Thought, Bilal, Elzhi, Westside Gunn, Christon Gray and others, the LP is based on the idea of growing up at 13 years old and seeing the world based on the morals learned at that age. The album includes production by Illmind, Thelonious Martin, Jahlil Beats, MarcNfinit, Apollo Brown, DJ Prince, and others, and also features cover art commissioned by comic book illustrator Chris B. Murray.

As the first project released as part of a newly formed label distribution deal between Empire Distribution and Skyzoo's own First Generation Rich imprint, the album serves as the official followup to his 2012 release A Dream Deferred. Music For My Friends was prematurely leaked on file sharing sites on the morning of June 17, 2015, prompting Skyzoo to release the digital versions of the album early. Physical copies stuck to the original street date of June 23, 2015. Among the singles are "Luxury", which features Westside Gunn, and had an official music video released.  Other singles from the LP included "Suicide Doors", "Women Who Can Cook", and "Civilized Leisure" featuring MoZaic.

The album was generally well received. It peaked at No. 15 on the US Top Heatseekers chart, and at No. 36 at Top R&B/Hip-Hop Albums, and was written about positively in the music press. HipHopDX gave the album 4/5 stars, writing that the album is "a collection of stories and anecdotes from Skyzoo's youth, with shout outs to — and from — friends and family." XXL wrote that "as with every offering from Skyzoo, his lyricism and imagery helps to bring the listener into his stories," and in July 2015, the staff at XXL included the album on their list of the "30 Best Hip-Hop Albums of 2015 (So Far)." On June 27, 2015, Skyzoo threw an album release concert in conjunction with popular hip hop website Okayplayer at the Blue Note jazz club in NYC. The concert showcased Skyzoo performing with a live six piece jazz band.

Skyzoo's social media use was referenced in the July 2015 edition Bloomberg Businessweek. Skyzoo has also licensed his music in various corporate outlets including NBA 2K11, NBA 2K12. Buffalo Wild Wings, NBA Shoot Around, Rockstar Games' Grand Theft Auto IV: The Lost and Damned, HBO's Entourage, and 2K Sports. Skyzoo has had tracks used as both the theme to ESPN's Whiplash TV and the soundtrack to a Guinness advert.

The Easy Truth (2016) 
In 2016, Skyzoo collaborated with Mello Music Group producer Apollo Brown. The project, a full-length studio album titlted The Easy Truth, was released September 30, 2016. The fifteen-track album contained multiple features from the likes of Patty Crash, Joell Ortiz, Conway, Westside Gunn, and Stalley. It was released to critical acclaim, reviewed by the likes of AllMusic, HipHopDX, and many others.

Peddler Themes EP and In Celebration of Us (2017) 
On March 27, 2017, Skyzoo announced, via Instagram, that he would be releasing two projects in 2017, an EP in July and a full-length studio album in December.

The first project of the year, an eight-track EP entitled Peddler Themes, was released on July 21, 2017. It features production work from the likes of Illmind, Apollo Brown, among others. Skyzoo even provides his own producing abilities on one of the tracks. The EP became available for pre-order on July 12, 2017, and its lead single "Finesse Everything" was released via iTunes, SoundCloud, among others.
In November, it was revealed that his album was completed and he later revealed the release date for February 2, 2018.

Musical style and influences 
Skyzoo has cited as influences hip hop artists such as Notorious B.I.G., Jay-Z, Nas, N.W.A, Big Daddy Kane, and Kid 'n Play, as well as non-hip hop artists such as Sade and Nirvana. He has credited J Dilla as one of his biggest inspirations and favorite producer.  A self-professed fan of the HBO crime drama The Wire, he frequently references the characters and plotlines in his music, and has cited show creator David Simon as one of his biggest idols as a writer. Also a fan of jazz, Skyzoo has stated that Miles Davis, John Coltrane, Horace Silver, and Wayne Shorter as his favorite artists in the genre. He has further stated that Coltrane's A Love Supreme is his favorite album in any genre.

Personal life 
An avid basketball fan, Skyzoo at times guest blogs for the online version of Slam magazine with a column named "Chain Link Champions." He is a vocal supporter of the New York Knicks basketball team.

On September 18, 2015, Skyzoo married long time girlfriend Courtney Taylor (née Hinckson).

He was previously linked to Sharlee Jeter, the sister of former New York Yankees baseball player Derek Jeter, which attracted some attention in the media. The couple called off an engagement and stopped seeing each other in 2010. Two years later there was speculation in the press that Skyzoo was the father of her newborn son, which was refuted. He is the cousin of Charlamagne Tha God

Awards and nominations

Discography

Albums

EPs

Mixtapes

Singles

Guest appearances

See also 
List of hip hop musicians

References

External links 

1982 births
African-American male rappers
Living people
Rappers from Brooklyn
21st-century American rappers
21st-century American male musicians
21st-century African-American musicians
20th-century African-American people